Anoop Sasikumar is an Indian economist and a novelist of Malayalam literature. He is the author of several articles on economics and his first novel, Ettamathe Velipadu, regarded by many as the first urban fantasy novel in Malayalam, was among the novels shortlisted for DC Books Literary Award in 2018.

Biography 
Born on 23 February 1984 in Kottayam district in the south Indian state of Kerala, Anoop Sasikumar graduated in mechanical engineering from Rajiv Gandhi Institute of Technology, Kottayam of Mahatma Gandhi University. He started his career as an engineer at Shapoorji Pallonji Group in 2006. After a year, he moved to  Consolidated Contractors International Company as a quality engineer. In 2009, he quit his job and moved to Hyderabad Central University (HCU) from where he earned his master's degree in economics. He continued at HCU to secure an MPhil and PhD in Economics . In 2015, he joined Birla Institute of Technology and Science, Pilani – Goa Campus as an assistant professor and he worked there until 2017.

Sasikumar is known to have done research in the field of economics and has published a number of articles, ResearchGate, an online repository of research articles, has listed 30 of them. He has also contributed chapters to books published by others. His first novel, Ettamathe Velipadu (The Eighth Revelation), shortlisted for the 2018 DC Books Literary Award, was published in 2019; it is considered by many to be the first urban fantasy novel in Malayalam. His second novel, Gotham, was published by Logos Books in 2020.

Sasikumar lives in Kottayam, Kerala.

Bibliography

Novels and novellas

Book chapters

Selected articles

See also 

 Cloud computing
 Statistical computing
 List of Malayalam-language authors by category
 List of Malayalam-language authors

Notes

References

Further reading

External links 
 
 
 
 
 
 

Malayalam novelists
Malayalam-language writers
1984 births
Indian male novelists
Living people
21st-century Indian novelists
Novelists from Kerala
21st-century Indian male writers
Indian economists
People from Kottayam district
Malayali people
Indian economics writers
Mahatma Gandhi University, Kerala alumni
Academic staff of Birla Institute of Technology and Science, Pilani
University of Hyderabad alumni
Indian mechanical engineers